Baek Mok-Hwa (born ) is a South Korean female volleyball player. She is part of the South Korea women's national volleyball team.

She participated in the 2014 FIVB Volleyball World Grand Prix.
On club level she played for Korea Ginseng Corporation in 2014.

References

External links
 Profile at FIVB.org
 http://www.fivb.org/EN/volleyball/competitions/WorldGrandPrix/2014/Players.asp?Tourn=WGP2014a&Team=KOR&No=116432

1989 births
Living people
South Korean women's volleyball players
Place of birth missing (living people)
Asian Games medalists in volleyball
Volleyball players at the 2014 Asian Games
Medalists at the 2014 Asian Games
Asian Games gold medalists for South Korea
Sportspeople from Gwangju